The Battle of the Bands is an EP by the German punk band Die Toten Hosen. The songs are sung under different aliases, which makes it kind of a "battle of the bands".

The EP was re-released remastered as whole on the 2007 re-release of Unter falscher Flagge.

Track listing
 "Faust in der Tasche" (Fist in the pocket) (Frege, von Holst/Frege) – 3:55 (as Ricky Curl and the Standing Ovations)
 "Head over Heels" (Trimpop/Frege) – 4:05 (as The Evil Kids)
 "Schöne Bescherung" (roughly Happy holidays; lit. Nice gift-giving, also Nice mess) (Breitkopf, Frege, von Holst, Meurer, Trimpop/Frege) – 2:23 (as Die Flinger Domspatzen)
 "La historia del pescador Pepe" (The story of Pepe the fisherman [in Spanish]) (Breitkopf, Frege, von Holst, Meurer, Trimpop/Frege) – 3:17 (as Little Pepito and the Swinging Pesetas)
 "Vom Surfen und vom Saufen" (About surfing and about drinking) (Breitkopf/Frege) – 2:49 (as Die Pebbles)

Singles
 1985: "Faust in der Tasche"

Personnel
Campino - vocals
Andreas von Holst - guitar
Michael Breitkopf - guitar
Andreas Meurer - bass
Trini Trimpop - drums

1985 EPs
Die Toten Hosen EPs